Hisar Division is one of the six divisions of Haryana State of India. The division comprises the districts of  Fatehabad, Hisar, Jind and Sirsa .

It is named after the Hisar (city) that was a fort in the late 10th century. The office of the Commissioner of Hisar division is situated in Hisar city.

See also

 Hisar (city)
 Hisar Urban Agglomeration
 Hisar district
 Hisar (Vidhan Sabha constituency)
 Hisar (Lok Sabha constituency)
 Districts of Haryana

References

Divisions of Haryana